"Fishing Blues" (also "Fishin' Blues")  is a blues song written in 1911 by Chris Smith, who is best known for "Ballin' the Jack". "Fishing Blues" was first recorded in 1928 by  "Ragtime Texas" Henry Thomas on vocals and guitar with the introduction and breaks played on quills, a type of panpipe. It is Roud Folk Song Index No. 17692.

The song ostensibly describes the pleasures of catching, cooking, and eating your own fish, particularly catfish. The refrain includes:

Recordings 

 1928Henry Thomas, 10-inch 78rpm single Vocalion 1249
 1930s{?)Sam Chatmon, included on the 1979 album Sam Chatmon's Advice
 1964Mike Seeger, on the album Mike Seeger
 1965The Holy Modal Rounders, on the album The Holy Modal Rounders 2
 1965The Lovin' Spoonful, on the album Do You Believe in Magic
 1966Jim Kweskin and the Jug Band, on the album See Reverse Side for Title
 1968John Martyn, on the album The Tumbler
 1969Taj Mahal, on the album Giant Step/De Ole Folks at Home
 1975 Lillebjørn Nilsen, on the album Byen med det store hjertet
 1977Richard Bargel, on the album Blue Steel
 1984John Sebastian, on the 2001 album One Guy, One Guitar 
 1990Nappy Brown, on the album Apples and Lemons
 2000Paramount Trio, on the album At the Crossroads of Collingwood and Fitzr
 2001Felonius Blues Revue, on the album Sketches in Blue
 2001David Thomas, on the album The Harry Smith Project: Anthology of American Folk Music Revisited
 2001Claire Tomlinson, on the album Black, White and Blues, Vol. 1
 2002Nitty Gritty Dirt Band, on the album Will the Circle Be Unbroken, Volume III
 2002Teja and Luke, on the album Better Day
 2003Disney, on the soundtrack album Finding Nemo: Ocean Favorites
 2003Doofus, on the album Handful of Songs
 2003Jean-Jacques Milteau, on the album Blue 3rd
 2003Artie Traum, Chris Shaw and Tom Akstens, on the album Big Trout Radio: Songs About Fishing 
 2003David Thompson and Ben Winship, on the album Fishing Music
 2004The Juggernauts, on the album As We Like It 
 2006Blues Etc., on the album Blues Etc. 
 2006Ben Bonham, on the album Kids Only 
 2006The Gutbucket Jug Band, on the album Raunchy, Paunchy, Rootless and Blue 
 2006Gareth Hedges and Lance Bennett, on the album Candy Man 
 2006Hell's Kitchen, on the album City Streets 
 2006Peter "Madcat" Ruth, on the album Live in Rio 
 2006Someday Baby, on the album Backbone Move 
 2007Bill and Kristin Morris, on the album Not Your Regular Cup of Tea
 2008Steve Baker and Dick Bird, on the album King Kazoo 
 2008Electric Apricot, on the soundtrack album of the movie Electric Apricot: Quest for Festeroo 
 2009Graham Hine, on the album You'll Be Hearing from Me Real Soon 
 2015Spuyten Duyvil, on the album The Social Music Hour, Vol. 1

References 

Songs about fish
Songs about fishers
1928 songs
Blues songs
Vocalion Records singles
The Lovin' Spoonful songs
Nitty Gritty Dirt Band songs
Taj Mahal (musician) songs
Okeh Records singles